Acton Burnell is a village and parish in the English county of Shropshire. Home to Concord College, it is also famous for an early meeting of Parliament where the Statute merchant was passed in 1283. The population at the 2011 census was 544.

The village today has a post office and Anglican parish church, as well as a Roman Catholic cemetery.

History
Running to the north-west of the village is a Roman road, that ran between the modern day settlements of Wroxeter and Leintwardine.

The etymology of Acton Burnell is Old English āc (oak) and tūn (farm, estate), joined with the family name Burnell (thus meaning the part of Acton held by the Burnell family).

It was the birthplace of Robert Burnell, a thirteenth century prelate, politician and regent under Edward I.

For 20 years, as guests of Sir Edward Smythe a former pupil, the monks of Douai, following expulsion from France in the French Revolution, lived in community at Acton Burnell until they moved to Somerset, where they founded Downside Abbey, in 1814.

Attractions
There are the remains of Acton Burnell Castle – not truly a castle but a fortified manor house — created by Robert Burnell and dating to the 13th century. Robert Burnell was the Bishop of Bath and Wells and Lord Chancellor to King Edward I. His family name was added to the placename Acton to give the village's name.

The entire village is designated as a conservation area.

Acton Burnell Hall is now inhabited by Concord College, an international college, in the grounds of which stand the remaining walls (gable ends) of the 'Parliament Barn' where the first English Parliament at which the Commons were adequately represented met in 1283. Previously Parliament had met at Shrewsbury.

Approximately  to the south of the village is Langley Chapel.

St Mary's Church

Acton Burnell's parish church — St Mary's — was also built by Robert Burnell and dates from circa 1260, though additions were made to it during the 16th century. The church is situated approximately 50 yards from the Castle.

Nearby villages
Nearby villages include Frodesley and Pitchford.

See also
Listed buildings in Acton Burnell

References

External links

Villages in Shropshire
Shrewsbury and Atcham
Civil parishes in Shropshire